The Picture of Dorian Gray (1913) is an American silent film, directed by Phillips Smalley, starring Wallace Reid, and with a screenplay by Lois Weber based on the novel The Picture of Dorian Gray (1890) by Oscar Wilde.

Cast
Wallace Reid as Dorian Gray
Lois Weber 
Phillips Smalley
Source:

See also
Adaptations of The Picture of Dorian Gray
Wallace Reid filmography

References

External links

1913 films
American silent short films
1913 drama films
Silent American drama films
Films based on The Picture of Dorian Gray
1913 short films
American black-and-white films
Films directed by Phillips Smalley
1910s American films
Silent horror films